Copelatus ceylonicus is a species of diving beetle. It is part of the genus Copelatus in the subfamily Copelatinae of the family Dytiscidae. It was described by Vazirani in 1969.

References

ceylonicus
Beetles described in 1969